Abducted in Plain Sight, also known as Forever B, is a 2017 true crime documentary film directed by Skye Borgman. The documentary covers the kidnappings of Jan Broberg, an Idaho child who was abducted by her neighbor Bob Lazar in the 1970s on two occasions. The former rocket scientist abducted and raped the little girl. The story was first told in Stolen Innocence: The Jan Broberg Story, a memoir published by her and her mother in 2003. It contains interview footage with Broberg Felt. It was produced by Top Knot Films and released by Netflix in 2019.

Reception
On the review aggregator website Rotten Tomatoes, the film has an approval rating of 75%, based on 24 reviews, with an average rating of 6.9/10.

Awards

References

External links
 
 

2017 films
2017 documentary films
American documentary films
Documentary films about crime in the United States
Documentary films about Idaho
Documentary films about pedophilia
2010s English-language films
2010s American films